Albinea (Reggiano:  or ) is a comune (municipality) in the Province of Reggio Emilia in the Italian region Emilia-Romagna, located about  west of Bologna and about  southwest of Reggio nell'Emilia.

A document shows that in 980 Holy Roman Emperor Otto II recognized the existence and rights of the ancient Pieve (parish church) of Albinea. From 1070 it was a possession of the bishops of Reggio, who also had a place here. Later, from 1412, it was a fief of the Manfredi family, who held it until 1730.

Albinea borders the following municipalities: Quattro Castella, Reggio Emilia, Scandiano, Vezzano sul Crostolo, Viano.

Albinea was for the most part of its history a rural village; nowadays, a pleasant landscape, between the plains and the lowest hills of the Apennines, a nice climate, and the opportunities of a developed centre have made Albinea an elegant and comfortable place. The short distance from Reggio Emilia allows many citizens to commute daily.

Twin towns
Albinea is twinned with:

  Treptow-Köpenick, Germany, since 1997

References

Cities and towns in Emilia-Romagna
Articles which contain graphical timelines